The Agbaja mine is a large iron mine located in central Nigeria in the Kogi State. Agbaja represents one of the largest iron ore reserves in Nigeria and in the world having estimated reserves of 1.25 billion tonnes of ore grading 48% iron metal.

References

Iron mines in Nigeria
Economy of Kogi State